Mahadev Jagannath Jankar is an Indian politician from Rashtriya Samaj Paksha. He is former Cabinet Minister in Government of Maharashtra as Minister for Animal Husbandry, Dairy Development and Fisheries Development in MAHAYUTI Govt. He is the founder and National President of Rashtriya Samaj Paksha, an Indian political party based in Maharashtra, founded in 2003.

Early life and education
Mr. Jankar was born in a poor peasant and Shepherds family in a small village at Palsawade  Ta.Maan which is in the Satara district. Jankar completed his Degree  In Electrical Engineering  with first class from Walchand College of Engineering, Sangli.

Political career 
Mr. Jankar started his political career by joining Bahujan Samaj Party in the leadership of Kanshi Ram. Then he became the chief of Yashwant Sena. But Yashwant Sena being a cultural organization had some limits in achieving political ends. 
In 2003, he founded the political party Rashtriya Samaj Paksha, contested the Madha Lok Sabha seat in 2009 elections, he finished in third place behind the winner, Sharad Pawar of the Nationalist Congress Party and Subhash Deshmukh of the Bharatiya Janata Party.

He also contested a Lok Sabha seat in 2014 from Baramati where he finished in second place behind the winner, Supriya Sule of the Nationalist Congress Party by a huge margin of 69,719.

He was elected as a Member of the Legislative Council on 23 January 2015. He was promoted in July 2016 as Minister for Animal Husbandry, Dairy Development and Fisheries Department, Maharashtra State.

References

1968 births
Marathi politicians
National Democratic Alliance candidates in the 2014 Indian general election
Living people
People from Satara district
Members of the Maharashtra Legislative Council
Rashtriya Samaj Paksha politicians
Bahujan Samaj Party politicians